Kian Thomas Flanagan (born 29 August 1999) is an English-born Irish professional footballer who plays as a midfielder, for  club Barnet.

Career

Club
Flanagan began his youth career with Southend United, moving to Crystal Palace in 2013, aged 13, for a fee of £37,500. In 2016, on his 17th birthday, he signed a two-year professional contract with the Eagles. In 2018–19, he won the club's young player of the season award, and saw his contract extended by a further year in 2019. In September 2019, Flanagan expressed his frustration at not having yet had a loan spell away from the club. Later that month, Flanagan went on trial at Doncaster Rovers with a view to a loan move in January. Manager Darren Moore was impressed by Flanagan, but no loan move materialised. He was named on Palace's released list at the end of the 2019–20 season, but remained with the club the following season before being released in the summer of 2021.

In July 2021, Flanagan signed for  club Barnet. He joined Cheshunt on loan in September 2022.

International
Flanagan is eligible for England and also the Republic of Ireland, who he has represented at under-17, under-18, and under-19 level.

Career statistics

References

External links

1999 births
Living people
Footballers from Westminster
Association football midfielders
English footballers
Republic of Ireland association footballers
Republic of Ireland youth international footballers
English people of Irish descent
Southend United F.C. players
Crystal Palace F.C. players
Barnet F.C. players
Cheshunt F.C. players
National League (English football) players